Helen Ma can refer to:
 Helen Ma (actress)
 Helen Ma (skater)